Yemen Airlines may refer to the following airlines:

Yemenia, the flag carrier airline of Yemen
Alyemda, the national airline of South Yemen